Juan Ortega may refer to:
 Juan Ortega (bishop) (died 1503), Roman Catholic prelate
 Juan José Ortega (1904–1996), Mexican film director, producer and screenwriter
 Juan Cánovas Ortega (born 1961), Spanish short story writer and poet
 Juan Carlos Ortega (born 1967), Mexican football manager and former player
 Juan Ortega (field hockey), Italian field hockey player

See also 
 Juan Ortega y Montañés (1627–1708), Roman Catholic bishop and colonial administrator
 Juan de Ortega (disambiguation)